Frederick Stanley Jackson (1875 – 15 April 1957) was a rugby footballer of the early 1900s who represented the Anglo/Welsh British Lions and the New Zealand national rugby league team.

Early years
Jackson was possibly born in Camborne and educated at the Camborne School of Mines. Other sources claim he was born in Swansea, Wales while the Manchester Evening News reported in 1900 that he was educated at Llandovery College and he may have served in the Boer War. No records of his birth have been found.

Rugby union career
A Cornish rugby union player (16 Cornish caps), Jackson played 'forward' for Camborne RFC, Plymouth, Leicester and represented A.F. Harding's Anglo/Welsh British Lions team in their tour to Australia and New Zealand in 1908. Jackson was the Leicester Tigers leading scorer in the 1906–07 season. He was reputed to be a powerful goal-kicker and was the star of Cornwall's championship-winning side in 1908 when he led the way in the 17–3 final victory over Durham in front of 17,000 spectators at Redruth R.F.C.'s Recreation Ground.

Jackson was suspended and recalled from the 1908 Lions tour of New Zealand, where he was considered the tourists' best forward, to be investigated by the Rugby Football Union for professionalism. He was accused of playing for the Swinton club under the name of "John Jones" and had represented Swansea under the name of "Gabe". Leaving his close friend and Leicester teammate John Jackett in tears on the wind-swept dockside, he sailed from Wellington to Sydney on the Maitai but, for whatever reason, decided he could not return to England and slipped back to New Zealand unannounced, and married Horowai Henderson from Te Araroa and had five children.

Rugby league career
Jackson played rugby league for both Auckland and New Zealand in 1910, captaining Auckland against the touring Great Britain Lions and also playing the country of his birth in the Test match for New Zealand, where he kicked four goals.

Later in the 1910 season he was suspended by the Auckland Rugby League for striking an official who had insulted his Māori companion.

Later years
Jackson married a young Maori woman from Te Araroa, Horowai Henderson. Initially they lived at Hastings with Paraire Tomoana and his wife Kuini, who was a relative of Henderson's. They later moved to Te Araroa on the East Cape where he became a selector for the East Coast Rugby Union. He died in Auckland on 15 April 1957.

Jackson had five children, Everard, Mary, Reginald Tutu Taonga Wi Repa, Sydney (Bully) and Irwin. Everard became a noted All Blacks prop. Sydney (Bully) Jackson and Tutu Wi Repa represented the New Zealand Māori rugby union team. Everard's son, Syd, was a prominent Māori activist, trade unionist and leader.

References

Further reading
 Mather, Tom. (2012) Rugby's Greatest Mystery. Who really was F. S. Jackson? London: London League Publications Ltd.

Bibliography
 

1870s births
1957 deaths
Auckland rugby league team players
British & Irish Lions rugby union players from England
British military personnel of the Second Boer War
British emigrants to New Zealand
New Zealand people of Cornish descent
Cornish rugby union players
Dual-code rugby internationals
Leicester Tigers players
New Zealand national rugby league team players
English rugby union players
New Zealand rugby league players
People educated at Llandovery College
People from Camborne
Plymouth Albion R.F.C. players
North Shore Albions players
Rugby league props
Rugby league second-rows
Date of birth missing
Fred